Live at Glenn Miller Café Vol 1 is an album by American jazz saxophonist Jemeel Moondoc, which was recorded in Stockholm and released on Ayler Records, a Swedish label founded by Jan Ström and Åke Bjurhamn. Moondoc leads a trio with bassist William Parker and drummer Hamid Drake. The rhythm section had recorded the studio album ...and William Danced a few hours earlier with local saxophonist Anders Gahnold.

Reception

In his review for AllMusic, Steve Loewy states "Moondoc is an underrated heavyweight of the saxophone: The elder statesman drinks from the well of Ornette Coleman, but Moondoc plies his own sound with a sighing lyricism that lures the listener into his den."

Track listing
All compositions by Jemeel Moondoc
"Hi-Rise" - 30:55
"Blues for my People" - 29:46

Personnel
Jemeel Moondoc - alto sax
William Parker - bass
Hamid Drake - drums

References

2002 live albums
Jemeel Moondoc live albums
Ayler Records live albums